Tommy Lindgren (born 1977) is a Finnish singer-songwriter best known as the vocalist of the band Don Johnson Big Band. Lindgren has also appeared with other ensembles such as GG Caravan and Ricky-Tick Big Band & Julkinen Sana.

An avid human rights activist, Lindgren has also worked as an informer and editorial secretary of the Finnish branch of Amnesty International, and he has been working with the "Dreams" activity of the Finnish Foundation for Children and Youth. Tommy Lindgren's father was Christer Lindgren, a Finnish culinary article editor and writer.

Discography

Solo albums
 Sininen kaupunki (2016)

Don Johnson Big Band

Studio albums
 Support de Microphones (2000)
 Breaking Daylight (2003)
 Don Johnson Big Band (2006)
 Records Are Forever (2009)
 Fiesta (2012)

Singles
 One MC, One Delay (2003)
 Jah Jah Blow Job (2003)
 Road (2006)
 Busy Relaxin' (2006)
 Private Intentions (2006)
 L.L.H. (2009)
 Running Man (2009)

GG Caravan

Studio albums
 GG Caravan (2012)

Ricky-Tick Big Band & Julkinen Sana

Studio albums
 Burnaa (2013)
 Korottaa panoksii (2015)

References

External links
 Tommy Lindgren on Twitter

1977 births
Living people
Finnish hip hop musicians
Finnish human rights activists
Finnish male singer-songwriters